Eduardo José Gomes Cameselle Mendez (18 January 1962 – 3 September 2020), known as Dito, was a Portuguese football central defender and manager.

Playing career

Club
Dito was born in Barcelos. He appeared in 358 Primeira Liga matches over 16 professional seasons, starting his career with S.C. Braga for which he was already an important first-team member at the age of 18, and signing for S.L. Benfica in 1986 after six years in Minho.

In his two-season spell with Benfica, Dito played 27 league games in his first year as the Lisbon club won the double, then partnered Carlos Mozer in the second (no silverware won). He then moved to rivals and title holders FC Porto for one season, with Benfica regaining their domestic supremacy at the expense of precisely the northerners.

From 1989 to 1994, always in the top division, Dito represented Vitória de Setúbal, S.C. Espinho and Gil Vicente FC. After a brief stint with A.D. Ovarense in the Segunda Liga, he retired from football aged 34.

International
Dito won 17 caps for Portugal, his debut arriving on 28 October 1981 at the age of 19 as he came on as a 46th-minute substitute for Humberto Coelho in a 4–1 away loss against Israel for the 1982 FIFA World Cup qualifiers. He did not attend any major international tournament, however.

On 23 February 1983, Dito scored the only goal in the friendly defeat of West Germany in the Portuguese capital, which marked the first-ever victory over that opposition.

|}

Coaching career
Dito's biggest achievement as a coach was managing S.C. Salgueiros over the course of three top-flight campaigns, being dismissed after the tenth round of 1999–2000 as the Paranhos team eventually retained their status. In 2009 he returned to his first club Braga, being appointed at the junior sides.

In July 2011, after guiding Braga District to the UEFA Regions' Cup, Dito returned to the senior game with Varzim S.C. of the third tier. He fulfilled his aim of winning promotion, doing so as champions in his only season, but then quit due to disputes with the board including an alleged four-month backlog in wages.

On 5 April 2017, Dito came back to the professional game after over a decade's hiatus, taking over F.C. Famalicão for the rest of the second division season. The following 22 January, he left by mutual consent.

Dito was hired by S.C. Covilhã of the same league on 27 May 2018. He left on 9 October, again by agreement between both parties, with the side second bottom.

In the 2019 off-season, Dito was appointed general manager at hometown club Gil Vicente FC, recently returned to the top tier.

Personal life
Dito's father, Spaniard Eduardo Cameselle Mendez, played for Gil Vicente in the 1950s. His nephew, also named Eduardo, was also a footballer.

Dito died on 3 September 2020, aged 58.

Honours
Braga
Taça de Portugal runner-up: 1981–82

Benfica
Primeira Liga: 1986–87
Taça de Portugal: 1986–87
Supertaça Cândido de Oliveira runner-up: 1986, 1987

Porto
Supertaça Cândido de Oliveira runner-up: 1988

References

External links

1962 births
2020 deaths
People from Barcelos, Portugal
Sportspeople from Braga District
Portuguese footballers
Association football defenders
Primeira Liga players
Liga Portugal 2 players
S.C. Braga players
S.L. Benfica footballers
FC Porto players
Vitória F.C. players
S.C. Espinho players
Gil Vicente F.C. players
S.C.U. Torreense players
A.D. Ovarense players
Portugal youth international footballers
Portugal under-21 international footballers
Portugal international footballers
Portuguese football managers
Primeira Liga managers
Liga Portugal 2 managers
G.D. Chaves managers
Portimonense S.C. managers
Moreirense F.C. managers
Varzim S.C. managers
F.C. Famalicão managers
S.C. Covilhã managers